The Acura CDX is a subcompact luxury crossover SUV produced by Acura, a luxury vehicle division of Honda, for the Chinese market. The CDX was manufactured by Guangqi Honda. The car made its debut at the Beijing Auto Show in April 2016. The CDX was produced at the Zengcheng Plant in Guangzhou, China and was available from July 2016 until April 2022, when Acura announced that the brand would leaving from the Chinese market.

Upon release, the CDX was planned as a Chinese domestic model, as Acura announcing it has no plans to launch in North America. According to Jon Ikeda, group vice president of Acura USA, Acura had considered selling the CDX in the United States, though that ultimately never happened.

In 2020, an A-Spec variant of the CDX was released, featuring more aggressive styling, blacked-out plastic trim, two-tone mirrors, and unique 18-inch wheels.

Powertrain

Power comes from a  1.5-liter DOHC VTEC Turbo "Earth Dreams" engine coupled to an 8-speed dual-clutch transmission. It is available in front-wheel drive (FWD) and all-wheel drive (AWD) configurations.

Chassis
The CDX is based on the Honda HR-V and uses a MacPherson strut independent front suspension with a torsion beam rigid axle rear suspension and is equipped with electronically adjustable adaptive damping that is similar to the Civic Type R.

Performance

References

External links
  

CDX
Cars introduced in 2016
2020s cars
Mini sport utility vehicles
Luxury crossover sport utility vehicles
Front-wheel-drive vehicles
All-wheel-drive vehicles
Hybrid sport utility vehicles
Partial zero-emissions vehicles
Cars of China